Bread & Barrels of Water is the second album by Outlandish. It was released in 2002. This album is considered the real start of Outlandish. The international version of Bread & Barrels Of Water released at 2004 and it gave Outlandish increased popularity.
This band became the first Danish (artist) band ever to hit the top of the charts around the world. Additionally, two songs from this album (Walou & Aicha) are chosen to be at the best 500 songs of the decade. The album reached number one in Denmark, Iceland, Norway & South Korea and it sold 2 million copies worldwide.

Track listing 
"Introduction"
"Guantanamo" - (reached #1 Denmark)
"Peelo"
"Walou"
"Aicha"
"Gritty"
"Interlude"
"If Only"
"Fatima’s Hand" (feat. Majid)
"El Moro" (feat. Majid)
"Eyes Never Dry"
"A Donkey Named Cheetah" (feat. Majid)
"Dirty Dirty East"
"Life is a Loom"

Release history

Charts

Weekly charts

Year-end charts

References

External links
Outlandish Official Website
Outlandish at MySpace

2002 albums
Outlandish albums